Sporting CP is a sports club, best known for its association football team, based in Lisbon, Portugal.

Sporting CP may also refer to:

 Sporting CP (athletics)
 Sporting CP (basketball)
 Sporting CP (beach soccer)
 Sporting CP (billiards)
 Sporting CP (cycling team)
 Sporting CP eSports
 Sporting CP (futsal)
 Sporting CP (handball)
 Sporting CP (roller hockey)
 Sporting CP (rugby union)
 Sporting CP (Superleague Formula team)
 Sporting CP (swimming)
 Sporting CP (table tennis)
 Sporting CP (volleyball)
 Sporting CP (women's football)
 Sporting CP/Tavira, now Atum General–Tavira–Maria Nova Hotel, a cycling team